The 2018 Total 6 Hours of Spa-Francorchamps was an endurance sports car racing event held at the Circuit de Spa-Francorchamps, Stavelot, Belgium on 3–5 May 2018. Spa-Francorchamps served as the first race of the 2018–19 FIA World Endurance Championship, and was the seventh running of the event as part of the championship. The race was won by the #8 Toyota TS050 Hybrid.

Qualifying

Qualifying results
Pole position winners in each class are marked in bold.

 – Only one driver of the No. 10 DragonSpeed set a lap time.
 – No.10 DragonSpeed withdrew due to Fittipaldi's high-speed crash at Eau Rouge.
 – Only one driver of the No. 86 Gulf Racing set a lap time.
 – Both Manors-run Ginettas withdrew after qualifying due to financial issues.
 – No.7 Toyota was excluded due to incorrect declaration of Fuel Flow Meter and will start from pit lane a lap down.

Race

Race result
The minimum number of laps for classification (70% of the overall winning car's race distance) was 114 laps. Class winners in bold.

Standings after the race

2018–2019 LMP World Endurance Drivers' Championship

2018–2019 LMP1 World Endurance Championship

 Note: Only the top five positions are included for the Drivers' Championship standings.

2018–2019 World Endurance GTE Drivers' Championship

2018–2019 World Endurance GTE Manufacturers' Championship

 Note: Only the top five positions are included for the Drivers' Championship standings.

Notes

References

External links 
 

Spa-Francorchamps
Spa-Francorchamps
6 Hours of Spa-Francorchamps
6 Hours of Spa-Francorchamps